Porca vacca is a 1982 Italian war-comedy film written and directed by Pasquale Festa Campanile. The film was panned by critics.

Plot    
During World War I Barbisetti, a mediocre artist also known as "Primo Baffo", tries to avoid the military service, but he doesn't succeed. During the war he meets two farmers, Tomo Secondo and Marianna, two scammers: the two manage to deceive the soldier many times, but eventually the three establish a friendship made of ups and downs.

Cast 

Renato Pozzetto: Primo Malvisetti aka Primo Baffo
Laura Antonelli: Marianna
Aldo Maccione: Tomo Secondo
Raymond Bussières: Uncle Nicola
Raymond Pellegrin: The General
Adriana Russo: The Ballet Dancer
Massimo Sarchielli: The Captain 
Gino Pernice: The "Professor"
Corrado Olmi: Ufficiale Medico
Enzo Robutti:  Captain Caimani del Piave
Maurizio Mattioli: Soldier from Bologna

See also       
 List of Italian films of 1982

References

External links

1982 films
Italian war comedy films
1980s war comedy films
Films directed by Pasquale Festa Campanile
Italian World War I films
Films scored by Ennio Morricone
Films scored by Riz Ortolani
1982 comedy films
1980s Italian-language films
1980s Italian films